Personnel is a 1975 Polish television drama film written and directed by Krzysztof Kieślowski and starring Juliusz Machulski, Michal Tarkowski, and Wlodzimierz Borunski. The film won the Grand Prize during the Mannheim International Filmfestival in October 1975 and numerous awards at national festivals, including the Grand Prix IV Koszalin Film Encounters "The Young and Film" in 1976. The film also won the Grand Prize in the field of television films in the Third Polish Film Festival in Gdańsk in 1976, where Kieślowski was also honored by the award of journalists. Personnel is Krzysztof Kieślowski's first feature-length film.

Plot
Romek Januchta (Juliusz Machulski) is a sensitive and honest young man who has a fascination with the magic of art. He finds work as a tailor at the opera. Confronted by the behind the scenes reality of stage productions—the bickering, the petty jealousies, the vindictiveness, and the corruption—Romek's illusions are soon shattered. A fellow tailor has been fired through the maliciousness of one of the performers, and Romek is faced with the choice of denouncing his friend.

Cast
 Juliusz Machulski as Romek Januchta
 Michal Tarkowski as Sowa 
 Wlodzimierz Borunski
 Edward Ciosek
 Waldemar Karst
 Wilhelm Klonowski
 Mieczyslaw Kobek
 Helena Kowalczykowa as Romek's aunt 
 Tomasz Lengren
 Irena Lorentowicz
 Ludwik Mika
 Henryk Sawicki
 Andrzej Siedlecki
 Krzysztof Sitarski
 Janusz Skalski

Reception

Awards and nominations
 1975 Mannheim International Filmfestival Grand Prize (Krzysztof Kieslowski) Won
 1976 Polish Film Festival Critics Award for Television Film (Krzysztof Kieslowski) Won
 1976 Polish Film Festival Silver Lion Award (Krzysztof Kieslowski) Won

References
Citations

Bibliography

External links
 

1975 television films
1975 films
Films directed by Krzysztof Kieślowski
Polish drama films
Films with screenplays by Krzysztof Kieślowski